Lucio Diodati (born 1955) is an Italian painter.

He was educated at the Academy of Fine Art in L'Aquila, Italy. Diodati's work has mainly been exhibited in the United States and Italy. His first paintings were exhibited in 1980. In 2002 he went to Cuba to get cultural inspiration for his work. This lead his working with clay and entering the world of sculpture.

It has been said that Dioati's artistic style is a mixture of cinema, theatre and painting, and that he is a perilous exponent of immoral irony. Diodati uses critical humor and a great deal of color in his paintings.

External links
 http://www.luciodiodati.com
Kunstclub.com profile for Lucio Diodati http://www.kunstclub.com/member/Diodati/
Lixow-com profile for Lucio Diodati http://www.lixow.com/Lucio_DIODATI
Artreview.com profile for Lucio Diodati http://www.artreview.com/profile/LucioDiodati
Artelista.com profile for Lucio Diodati http://diodatilucio.artelista.com/
Gigarte.com profile for Lucio Diodati http://www.gigarte.com/iscritto/index.php?&id=6203&p=&s=

20th-century Italian painters
Italian male painters
21st-century Italian painters
1955 births
Living people
Place of birth missing (living people)
20th-century Italian male artists
21st-century Italian male artists